Paul Lekics is a retired American soccer midfielder who spent eight seasons with the Richmond Kickers.

Youth
Lekics graduated from Crystal Lake South High School where he was a 1991 Third Team High School All American soccer player. He attended the Creighton University, playing on the men's soccer team from 1992 to 1996.  He graduated with a bachelor's degree in marketing.

Professional
In December 1995, the Atlanta Ruckus selected Lekics in the A-League draft, but he chose to remain in school for one more season.  In 1997, Lekics turned professional with the Richmond Kickers of the USISL A-League.   On February 1, 1998, the Chicago Fire selected Lekics in the third round (twenty-fifth overall) of the 1998 MLS College Draft.  On March 2, 1998, the Fire waived Lekics in a pre-season roster reduction. He returned to the Kickers and played for them until his retirement in 2004.

In 2009, Lekics became an assistant coach with the California State University, Stanislaus men's soccer team.

References

External links
 Cal State Stanislaus: Paul Lekics

1974 births
Living people
American soccer coaches
American soccer players
Creighton Bluejays men's soccer players
Richmond Kickers players
A-League (1995–2004) players
People from Crystal Lake, Illinois
Soccer players from Illinois
Chicago Fire FC draft picks
Association football midfielders
Sportspeople from the Chicago metropolitan area
College men's soccer coaches in the United States